George Kwasi Semakor (born January 6, 1988, in Kumasi) is a Ghanaian footballer of Ugandan descent who has been naturalized to represent Qatar. He is a defender for Al Gharrafa.

Career
George Kwasi Semakor left his club, Al-Mu'aidar, in August 2008 to sign with Al-Gharrafa Sports Club.

International career
He is a member of the Qatar national football team.

Personal life
Semakor was born in Kumasi to Ugandan parents.

References

1988 births
Living people
Footballers from Kumasi
Qatari footballers
Qatar international footballers
Ghanaian footballers
Qatari people of Ugandan descent
Ghanaian people of Ugandan descent
Ghanaian emigrants to Qatar
Association football defenders
Qatar Stars League players
Qatari Second Division players
Naturalised citizens of Qatar
Al-Gharafa SC players
Al-Sailiya SC players
Muaither SC players